I Just Can't Keep On Going is a Tyrone Davis album released in 1980. This was his sixth Columbia Records release.

Singles
One single were released from the album. A cover of the Marvin Gaye classic "How Sweet It Is (To Be Loved by You)", which reached No. 36 on the Billboard Hot Soul Singles chart in 1980.

Track listing
 "How Sweet It Is (To Be Loved By You)" – 4:05
 "I Just Can't Keep On Going" – 3:35
 "I'm Glad You're Here with Me Tonight" – 4:31
 "Overdue" – 4:02
 "Comin' Back Baby" – 4:40
 "We Don't Need No Music" – 5:15
 "Never Stopped Loving You" – 3:52
 "Wanna Make It Good" – 4:58

Personnel
 Tyrone Davis – lead vocals
 Byron Gregory, Danny Leake, Herb Walker, Pat Ferreri – guitar
 Paul Richmond – guitar, bass 
 Bernard Reed – bass
 Aventino Calvetti, Steve Rodby – bass (string)
 Morris Jennings, Ruben Locke – drums
 Charles Kalimba-Ki, Geraldo de Oliveira – percussion
 Calvin Bridges – organ
 Bernadene Davis, Billy Durham, Cynthia Harrell, Francine Smith, James Mack, Jo Ann Brown-El, Leo Graham, Wales Wallace – background vocals
  Barbara Haffner, William Cernota, Elaine Mack, Karl Fruh – cello
 Albert Smith, Kaye Clements, Steele Seals – saxophone
 Elmer Brown, Paul Howard, Peter Harvey – trumpet
 Daniel Strba, Martin Abrams, Rami Solomonow, Susan Dickstein – viola
 Adrian Gola, Arnold Ruth, Barbara Breckman, Carol Weiss, Darrell Bloch, David Hildner, Edward Green, Edmund Lee Bauer, Elliott Golub, Everett Zlatoff-Mirsky, Hilel Kagan, Phyllis McKenny, Raya Kodesh, Roger Moulton, Sol Bobrov – violin

Charts

References

External links
 

1980 albums
Tyrone Davis albums
Columbia Records albums
Albums produced by Leo Graham (songwriter)